Michele de 'Medici of Ottajano, Prince of Ottajano (Naples, 11 May 1823 – Naples, 22 February 1882) was an Italian noble and politician.

Biography 
A member of a cadet branch of the Medici family, called the Princes of Ottajano, he also possessed the titles of Prince of Venafro, Duke of Sarno and Miranda, Michele de 'Medici di Ottajano was appointed senator of the Kingdom of Italy 28 February 1876.

On the occasion of his wedding with Giulia Marulli, with whom he then had four children, he renovated the Medici palace of Ottaviano, a monumental building in Naples.

References

Ottaviano
1823 births
1882 deaths
19th-century Neapolitan people